Douvillinella is an extinct genus of prehistoric brachiopods in the extinct family Douvillinidae. Species are from the Devonian of the Czech Republic and Germany. C. elegans (also spelled Crinostrophia elegans) is found only at Arauz Formation, Lezna Member, Palencia Province, North Spain (Devonian of Spain).

See also 
 List of brachiopod genera

References 

 H. Jahnke. 1971. Fauna und Alter der Erbslochgrauwacke (Brachiopoden und Trilobiten, Unter-Devon, Rheinisches Schiefergebirge und Harz. Goettinger Arbeiten zur Geologie und Palaeontologie 9:1-105

External links 

 
 
 Crinostrophia elegans at fossilworks

Prehistoric brachiopod genera
Strophomenida
Devonian brachiopods